Halifax County Public Schools is a school district serving Halifax County, Virginia. It consists of seven elementary schools, one middle school, one high school,  one early learning center, and a STEM Center.

Administration

Superintendent 
The current superintendent is Mark Y. Lineburg. Dr. Lineburg has been superintendent since July 1 of the 2017-18 school year. Before coming to Halifax County Public Schools, Lineburg was an assistant principal at Churchland High School. He also served as the superintendent of Bristol Virginia Public Schools from 2010 to 2014, and the superintendent of Winchester Public Schools from 2014 to 2016. Lineburg also worked in the Radford City, Campbell County, and Amherst County school systems.

School Board 
There are currently eight members on the Halifax County School Board. They are elected by district.

 District 1: Patricia K. "Kathy" Fraley (Chairman)
 District 2: Roy Keith Lloyd
 District 3: Sandra K. Garner-Coleman
 District 4: Jason H. "Jay" Camp
 District 5: Freddie M. Edmunds
 District 6: Mr. S. Todd Moser (Vice-Chairman)
 District 7: Mr. Keith A. McDowell
 District 8: Mr. Walter C. Potts, Jr.

Schools

Early Learning Center 
 South Boston Early Learning Center

Elementary schools 
 Clays Mill Elementary School
 Cluster Springs Elementary School
 Meadville Elementary School
 Scottsburg Elementary School
 Sinai Elementary School
 South Boston Elementary School
 Sydnor Jennings Elementary School

Middle school 
 Halifax County Middle School

High school 
 Halifax County High School

Other schools 

 Halifax County STEM Academy

See also 
 List of school divisions in Virginia

References

External links 
 Official Site

Education in Halifax County, Virginia
School divisions in Virginia